Longleat Safari and Adventure Park in Wiltshire, England, was opened in 1966 as the world's first drive-through safari park outside Africa.

History
The park is situated in the grounds of Longleat House, an English stately home which is open to the public and is the home of the 8th Marquess of Bath. Longleat Safari Park and the concept of safari parks were the brainchild of Jimmy Chipperfield (1912–1990), former co-director of Chipperfield's Circus.

In 2022, Longleat welcomed the birth of a southern koala joey. It is the first of its kind to be born in Europe.

Description

Longleat house and grounds 

Opened to the public in 1949, the ancestral home of the Marquess of Bath remains a popular attraction with visitors. Visitors can join one of the many regular house tours or simply walk about at their leisure. They may also explore the gardens surrounding the house and visit a number of cafés within the grounds. A separate ticket is sold for visitors who only wish to visit the house and gardens.

Safari Park

East African Reserve 
The East African Reserve, which contains Rothschild giraffes, Grant's zebras, ostriches, Black wildebeest, Brazilian Tapir, African spurred tortoise, ring tailed lemurs, African pygmy goats, Somali sheep, Cameroon sheep and, since 2022, a male capybara and a separate enclosure for a male common warthog.

Jungle Cruise 
The Jungle Cruise (known as the Safari Boat until 2011) is a short trip around Half Mile Lake. The journey takes visitors past the Island, which was a former home to the elderly male western lowland gorilla Nico, the oldest gorilla in Europe, until his death aged 56 on 7 January 2018 and is now home to Black-and-white colobus monkeys.

Monkey Temple 
Opened in 2012, the centrepiece of this attraction is a large themed ruin with long rope walkways running across the paths, which allows visitors to safely interact with a variety of marmosets and tamarins.

Giant Otters and Crocodiles  
Branching off from Monkey Temple, this attraction opened in 2019. Previously the enclosure was home to a colony of captive-bred Humboldt penguins which were first displayed in 2013, however there were several outbreaks of avian malaria in September 2016  and December 2018.

Animal Adventure 

Containing many animals previously kept in Pets' Corner, this area which contains many exotic and familiar mammals, birds, reptiles and insects opened in 2009.

Longleat Railway

Established in 1965 and expanded in 1976, this  gauge ridable miniature railway is among the busiest in the country. It has a length of  through scenic woodland and along the edge of Half Mile Lake. The line has taken several different courses across the years, but the route along the lake has remained consistent. After opening the railway was originally run by outside company Minirail on a ten-year contract, which was not renewed due to disagreements between the two companies. Following this, Longleat took over running the railway in 1976. Many engines have run on the railway over the years, both steam and diesel; as of 2018 the railway owns three diesel locomotives. The railway also has 15 carriages, all built at Longleat between 1976 and 2013 and wearing mock British Railways crimson and cream livery, along with several permanent way wagons. Between 2011 and 2017 the railway was known as the Jungle Express, with the station and carriages given additional theming.

Current locomotives

Former locomotives

In the media
The Lions of Longleat - A 1967 BBC One documentary about the newly opened safari park with commentary by Lord Bath and Jimmy Chipperfield.
Lion Country - 55-part documentary series broadcast on BBC One in 1998.
 Animal Park is a series airing on the BBC starting in 2000 it is presented by Kate Humble & Ben Fogle, Paul Heiney and Jean Johansson.  With two spin offs Animal Park: Wild in Africa in 2005.  and 'Animal Park: Wild on the West Coast'' in 2007.

See also
 List of zoos by country

References

External links 

 Longleat Safari Park

1966 establishments in England
Zoos in England
Tourist attractions in Wiltshire
Buildings and structures in Wiltshire
Zoos established in 1966
15 in gauge railways in England
Safari parks